The Dnieper barbel (Barbus borysthenicus) is a species of cyprinid fish in the genus Barbus.

Footnotes 
 

Dnieper barbel
Dnieper basin
Cyprinid fish of Europe
Dnieper barbel